Harutaeographa castanea is a moth of the family Noctuidae. It is found in Nepal (the Kathmandu Valley).

References

Moths described in 1993
Orthosiini